Shane Peter McClanahan (born April 28, 1997) is an American professional baseball pitcher for the Tampa Bay Rays of Major League Baseball (MLB). He made his MLB debut in 2020.

Early life
McClanahan was born in Baltimore, Maryland, and lived there until age five. He attended Cape Coral High School in Cape Coral, Florida. McClanahan went from throwing 82-84 MPH in his junior year to throwing in the low 90s after hitting a growth spurt, which brought him from 5’6 to 6 foot between his junior and senior year. During his high school career he went 29–7 with a 1.02 earned run average (ERA) and 187 strikeouts in 123 innings pitched. He was drafted by the New York Mets in the 26th round of the 2015 Major League Baseball draft. He did not sign with the Mets and attended the University of South Florida (USF)

College career
McClanahan did not play his freshman year at USF in 2016, after undergoing Tommy John surgery. He returned from the injury in 2017, going 4-2 with a  3.20 ERA and 104 Strikeouts in 15 starts as a redshirt freshman. In 2018, McClanahan made 14 starts for USF tallying a league best 120 strikeouts, while going 5-6 with a 3.42 ERA.  McClanahan’s 120 strikeouts rank fourth on USF's single-season list along with allowing just 6.01 hits per nine innings in 2018, ranking 18th in the country. McClanahan was part of USF's first combined no-hitter against Army on March 16, 2018, a game in which he struck out a career high 15 hitters becoming just the second USF pitcher to strike out 100 or more in back-to-back seasons.

Entering the 2018 MLB Draft, McClanahan was considered one of the top prospects available in the draft.

Professional career

Minor Leagues
The Tampa Bay Rays selected McClanahan with the 31st overall selection in the 2018 Major League Baseball draft. He signed with the Rays for a $2,230,100 signing bonus. He made his professional debut with the GCL Rays and was promoted to the Princeton Rays in mid-August. In seven innings pitched between the two teams, he did not give up a run. He began 2019 with the Bowling Green Hot Rods, was their Opening Day starter, and earned Midwest League All-Star honors. He was promoted to the Charlotte Stone Crabs in June after posting a 4–4 record in 11 appearances (10 starts) with a 3.40 ERA and 74 strikeouts in 53 innings pitched.

Tampa Bay Rays

2020-2021
McClanahan was selected to the 40-man roster and added to the Rays’ Wild Card roster ahead of their series vs the Toronto Blue Jays on September 29, 2020. He made his debut on October 5, 2020, against the Yankees in the ALDS, becoming the first pitcher to have their debut in the postseason and fifth player overall, following Alex Kirilloff, Adalberto Mondesi, Mark Kiger, and Bug Holliday.

On April 28, 2021, The Rays promoted  McClanahan to the MLB. He made his regular season debut against the Oakland Athletics pitching 4 innings allowing 2 runs and 5 Strikeouts. On September 11, 2021, McClanahan was placed on the 10-day IL with back tightness. He was activated on September 19. He finished the 2021 season going 10–6 record with a 3.43 ERA and 141 strikeouts in  innings.

2022 season
After finishing a solid rookie season in 2021, the Rays named McClanahan as the Opening Day starter for the 2022 season. On April 24, McClanahan took a no-hitter into the 7th inning against the Boston Red Sox. On April 30, McClanahan had a career high 11 strikeouts in 5 innings against the Minnesota Twins. On May 11, McClanahan pitched 7 shut out innings and striking out 11 against the Los Angeles Angels. He was awarded the American League Player of the Week for the week of May 8-14. 

McClanahan was selected to the 2022 MLB All-Star Game, after ending the first half of the season going 10-3 with a 1.72 ERA and 147 strikeouts. McClanahan was named the starting pitcher for the American League in the All-Star game. He pitched 1 innings allowing 2 runs on 4 hits. On August 31, McClanahan was placed on the 15-day IL due to a left shoulder impingement. He was activated from the IL on September 15.

McClanahan finished the 2022 regular season pitching 166.1 innings, going 12-8, with 194 Strikeouts and a 2.54 ERA. He led the American League in numerous categories, such as SO/9, Strikeout-to-walk ratio, and Wins Above Replacement. He also finished second in WHIP and Opponent Batting average, finishing behind Justin Verlander.

Personal life
McClanahan is in a relationship with soccer player Andrea Rán Snæfeld Hauksdóttir. The couple met while they attended college at the University of South Florida.

References

External links

USF Bulls bio

1997 births
Living people
People from Cape Coral, Florida
Baseball players from Florida
Major League Baseball pitchers
Tampa Bay Rays players
American League All-Stars
South Florida Bulls baseball players
Gulf Coast Rays players
Princeton Rays players
Bowling Green Hot Rods players
Charlotte Stone Crabs players
Montgomery Biscuits players